The 5th Army Aviation Regiment "Rigel" is an Italian Army regiment based at Casarsa Airport in Friuli Venezia Giulia. The regiment is part of the army aviation and assigned to the Airmobile Brigade "Friuli". Formed in 1976 as support unit of the V Army Corps the regiment is the oldest and highest decorated Italian aviation regiment. The regiment, together with the 7th Army Aviation Regiment "Vega", constitutes the Italian Army's combat aviation and tactical lift capability.

History 
On 1 February 1956 the Experimental Helicopters Unit was formed in Casarsa for the V Army Corps. On 1 July 1957 the Experimental Helicopters Unit was renamed I Helicopters Unit and on 1 February 1963 it was renumbered as V Helicopters Unit. On the same date the light aircraft sections of the 182nd Armored Infantry Regiment "Garibaldi" and the 33rd Field Artillery Regiment were merged to form the V Light Aviation Unit, which was based at the time at Vittorio Veneto Airfield. In 1970 the V Helicopters Unit was renamed V General Use Helicopters Unit.

Formation 
During the 1975 Army reform the army reorganized its aviation units and for the first time created aviation units above battalion level. On 1 January 1976 the 5th Army Light Aviation Grouping "Rigel" was formed at Casarsa Airport and took command of the following aviation units of the V Army Corps:

 V Light Aviation Unit, which was renamed: 25th Army Light Aviation Squadrons Group "Cigno"
 V General Use Helicopters Unit, which was renamed: 55th Multirole Helicopters Squadrons Group "Dragone"

From 1 June 1976 the grouping was organized as follows:

  5th Army Light Aviation Grouping "Rigel", at Casarsa Airport
 25th Army Light Aviation Squadrons Group "Cigno", at Vittorio Veneto Airfield
 Command and Services Squadron
 251st Light Airplanes Squadron (SM.1019A planes)
 425th Reconnaissance Helicopters Squadron (AB 206 helicopters)
 55th Multirole Helicopters Squadrons Group "Dragone", at Casarsa Airport
 Command and Services Squadron
 551st Multirole Helicopters Squadron (AB 204B/205 helicopters)
 552nd Multirole Helicopters Squadron (AB 204B/205 helicopters)
 553rd Multirole Helicopters Squadron (AB 204B/205 helicopters)
 554th Multirole Helicopters Squadron (AB 204B/205 helicopters)

The plan to form an Attack Helicopters Squadrons Group for the grouping with four squadrons and a total of 24 attack helicopters was canceled due to funding issues.

Naming 
Since the 1975 army reform Italian army aviation units are named for celestial objects: groupings, and later regiments, are numbered with a single digit and named for stars in the 88 modern constellations. Accordingly, an army aviation regiment's coat of arms highlights the name-giving star within its constellation. Squadron groups were numbered with two digits and named for constellations, or planets of the Solar System. The 5th Army Light Aviation Grouping was named for Rigel the brightest star in the Orion constellation. When the army raised army aviation support regiments in 1996 they were named in relation to the regiment they supported, and therefore the 5th Rigel's support regiment was named 2nd Army Aviation Support Regiment "Orione".

On 14 March 1977 the grouping was granted its flag by decree 173 of the President of the Italian Republic Giovanni Leone. Since then one Military Order of Italy, two Silver Medals of Army Valour, one for the regiment's service after the 1976 Friuli earthquake, and one for the regiment's service and sacrifice during the yearly stages of the Yugoslav Wars, a Silver Medal of Civil Valour for the regiment's mountain rescue service in the Julian Alps, have been awarded to the regiment and, together with one Bronze Medal of Army Valour awarded autonomous 49th Reconnaissance Helicopters Squadrons Group "Capricorno" for its services after the 1976 Friuli earthquake, attached to the regiment's flag.

Recent times 
On 30 November 1985 the 25th Army Light Aviation Squadrons Group "Cigno" at Vittorio Veneto Airfield and the 47th Reconnaissance Helicopters Squadrons Group "Levrieri" at Prosecco Airfield were disbanded. The next day the 48th Reconnaissance Helicopters Squadrons Group "Pavone" at Campoformido Airport was renamed 25th Reconnaissance Helicopters Squadrons Group "Cigno" and transferred from the Mechanized Division "Mantova" to the 5th "Rigel". The same day the 49th Reconnaissance Helicopters Squadrons Group "Capricorno" of the Armored Division "Ariete" joined the 5th "Rigel" and airfield at Prosecco was assigned to the 5th Rigel as secondary base. The personnel and materiel of the disbanded squadrons groups was integrated into the remaining units of the 5th Rigel.

On 6 October 1991 the 5th Army Light Aviation Grouping "Rigel" was renamed 5th Army Light Aviation Regiment "Rigel". The regiment was now organized as follows:

  5th Army Light Aviation Regiment "Rigel", at Casarsa Airport
 25th Reconnaissance Helicopters Squadrons Group "Cigno", at Campoformido Airport
 Command and Services Squadron
 481st Reconnaissance Helicopters Squadron (AB 206 helicopters)
 482nd Reconnaissance Helicopters Squadron (AB 206 helicopters)
 49th Reconnaissance Helicopters Squadrons Group "Capricorno", at Casarsa Airport
 Command and Services Squadron
 491st Reconnaissance Helicopters Squadron (AB 206 helicopters)
 492nd Reconnaissance Helicopters Squadron (AB 206 helicopters)
 55th Multirole Helicopters Squadrons Group "Dragone", at Casarsa Airport
 Command and Services Squadron
 551st Multirole Helicopters Squadron (AB 204B/205 helicopters)
 552nd Multirole Helicopters Squadron (AB 204B/205 helicopters)
 553rd Multirole Helicopters Squadron (AB 204B/205 helicopters)
 554th Multirole Helicopters Squadron (AB 204B/205 helicopters)

On 7 January 1992 two helicopters of the regiment are attacked and one shot down by two Yugoslav Air Force MiG-21 fighter jets near Podrute in Croatia, resulting in the death of four members of the regiment and one French officer.

In 1992 the regiment began the transition from AB 206 helicopters to A129 Mangusta attack helicopters and consequently on 1 June 1992 the 49th Reconnaissance Helicopters Squadrons Group Capricorno" was renamed 49th Attack Helicopters Squadrons Group "Capricorno" on the same day. On 1 October 1992 the 55th Army Light Aviation Squadrons Group "Dragone" moved from at Casarsa Airport to Padua Airport. On 12 June 1993 the regiment was renamed 5th Army Aviation Regiment "Rigel". On 31 December 1995 the secondary base at Prosecco Airfield was closed.

On 5 July 1996 the 7th Attack Helicopters Regiment "Vega" was formed at Casarsa Airport. On the same day the 49th Attack Helicopters Squadrons Group "Capricorno" was transferred from the 5th Rigel to the new regiment and the 5th Rigel moved its headquarter from Casarsa Airport to Campoformido Airport. On the same day the 55th Army Aviation Squadrons Group "Dragone" was transferred from the 5th Rigel to the Aviation Command of the Northwestern Military Region.

On 1 October 1997 the 5th Rigel was transferred from the V Army Corps and to the Army Aviation Inspectorate. On 1 September 1998 the regiment and the 25th Army Aviation Squadrons Group "Cigno", 48th Attack Helicopters Squadrons Group "Pavone" (ceded by the 7th Attack Helicopters Regiment "Vega"), and 53rd Army Aviation Squadrons Group "Cassiopeia" (ceded by the 3rd Army Aviation Regiment "Aldebaran") moved to the former Italian Air Force Miramare Air Base near Rimini. On 23 October of the same year the 5th Rigel and 7th Vega swapped name and flags, and the 5th Rigel returned to its traditional base at Casarsa Airport.
 
On 1 May 2000 the 5th Rigel was transferred from the Army Aviation Inspectorate to the Airmobile Brigade "Friuli". In 2008 the regiment began the transition from AB 204B/205 to NH90 helicopters, which was complete by 2017.

Current Structure 

As of 2022 the 5th Army Aviation Regiment "Rigel" consists of:

  5th Army Aviation Regiment "Rigel", at Casarsa Airport
 Headquarters Unit
 27th Squadrons Group "Mercurio"
 271st Combat Support Helicopters Squadron
 272nd Combat Support Helicopters Squadron
 273rd Combat Support Helicopters Squadron
 49th Squadrons Group "Capricorno"
 491st Attack Helicopters Squadron
 492nd Attack Helicopters Squadron
 493rd Attack Helicopters Squadron
 Support Squadrons Group "Lupo"
 Logistic Support Squadron
 Aircraft Maintenance Squadron

Equipment 
The 27th Squadrons Group "Mercurio" is equipped with NH90 transport helicopters and the 49th Squadrons Group "Capricorno" with A129D Mangusta attack helicopters.

See also 
 Army Aviation

External links
 Italian Army Website: 5° Reggimento Aviazione dell'Esercito "Rigel"

References

Army Aviation Regiments of Italy